Visa requirements for Saint Kitts and Nevis citizens are administrative entry restrictions imposed by the authorities of foreign states on citizens of Saint Kitts and Nevis.  citizens of Saint Kitts and Nevis had visa-free or visa on arrival access (including eTAs) to 157 countries and territories, ranking the Saint Kitts and Nevis passport 25th in terms of travel freedom according to the Henley Passport Index.

In 2022, four new visa waivers have been signed, bringing the total visa-free or visa on arrival access (including eTAs) to 161 countries, ranking the Saint Kitts and Nevis passport as the number one Caribbean passport (tied with Barbados) and 24th overall in the world in terms of travel freedom at the time.

Visa requirements map

Visa requirements

Dependent, Disputed, or Restricted territories
Unrecognized or partially recognized countries

Dependent and autonomous territories

Future
St. Kitts and Nevis is signing visa-free deals with many countries and it will likely overtake  as the best passport in Caricom.

Additional Rules

Visa exemption for Schengen States

St. Kitts and Nevis citizens are classified as 'Annex II' foreign nationals, and so are permitted to stay visa-free in the 26 member states of the Schengen Area as a whole — rather than each country individually — for a period not exceeding 3 months every 6 months. ETIAS will be required for entry starting 2023.

Visa exemption in CARICOM States
St. Kitts and Nevis citizens wishing to live and work in another CARICOM State should obtain a CSME Skills Certificate. This must be presented at Immigration in the receiving country along with a valid passport and a police certificate of character. Holders of certificates are given a maximum of six months stay in the host country until their status and documents could be verified. Additional documents are required if travelling with spouse and/or dependants such as Marriage certificate, Birth Certificate, etc.

Visa exemption in OECS States
Citizens of St. Kitts and Nevis can live and work in Antigua and Barbuda, Dominica, Grenada, Saint Lucia and Saint Vincent and the Grenadines as a result of right of freedom of movement granted in Article 12 of the Protocol of the Eastern Caribbean Economic Union of the Revised Treaty of Basseterre.

Visa exemption and requirements for the United Kingdom
St. Kitts and Nevis citizens are able to visit the United Kingdom for up to 6 months (or 3 months if they enter from the Republic of Ireland) without the need to apply for a visa as long as they fulfil all of the following criteria:
 they do not work during their stay in the UK
 they must not register a marriage or register a civil partnership during their stay in the UK
 they can present evidence of sufficient money to fund their stay in the UK (if requested by the border inspection officer)
 they intend to leave the UK at the end of their visit and can meet the cost of the return/onward journey
 they have completed a landing card and submitted it at passport control unless in direct transit to a destination outside the Common Travel Area
 if under the age of 18, they can demonstrate evidence of suitable care arrangements and parental (or guardian's) consent for their stay in the UK

However, even though, strictly speaking, he/she is not required to apply for a visa if he/she satisfies all of the above criteria, a St. Kitts and Nevis citizen who falls into any of the following categories has been strongly advised by the UK Border Agency (replaced by UK Visas and Immigration) to apply for a visa prior to travelling to the UK:
 he/she has any unspent criminal convictions in any country
 he/she has previously been refused or breached the terms of any entry to the UK, or been deported or otherwise removed from the UK
 he/she has previously applied for a visa and been refused one
 he/she has been warned by a UK official that he/she should obtain a visa before travelling to the UK

St. Kitts and Nevis citizens with a grandparent born either in the United Kingdom, Channel Islands or Isle of Man at any time or in the Republic of Ireland on or before 31 March 1922 can apply for UK Ancestry Entry Clearance, which enables them to work in the UK for 5 years, after which they can apply to settle indefinitely.

Consular protection of St. Kitts and Nevis citizens abroad 

St. Kitts and Nevis citizens who require consular assistance in a foreign country where there is no St. Kitts and Nevis foreign mission may be able to request assistance from a British Embassy, high commission or consulate. For example, a citizen of St. Kitts and Nevis who need to travel urgently and whose passport has expired, been lost or stolen can be issued with an emergency travel document by a British foreign mission as long as this has cleared with the Ministry of Foreign Affairs of Saint Kitts and Nevis.
See List of diplomatic missions of Saint Kitts and Nevis.

Vaccination
Many African countries, including Angola, Benin, Burkina Faso, Cameroon, Central African Republic, Chad, Democratic Republic of the Congo, Republic of the Congo, Côte d'Ivoire, Equatorial Guinea, Gabon, Ghana, Guinea, Liberia, Mali, Mauritania, Niger, Rwanda, São Tomé and Príncipe, Senegal, Sierra Leone, Uganda, Zambia require all incoming passengers to have a current International Certificate of Vaccination. Some other countries require vaccination only if the passenger is coming from an infected area.

Fingerprinting
Several countries including Argentina, Cambodia, Japan, Malaysia, Saudi Arabia, South Korea and the United States demand all passengers to be fingerprinted on arrival.

Passport validity
Many countries require passport validity of no less than 6 months and one or two blank pages. Countries requiring passport validity of at least 6 months on arrival include Afghanistan, Algeria, Bhutan, Botswana, Brunei, Cambodia,  Comoros, Côte d'Ivoire, Ecuador, Egypt, El Salvador, Fiji, Guyana, Indonesia, Iran, Iraq (except when arriving at Basra – 3 months and Erbil or Sulaimaniyah – on arrival), Israel, Kenya, Laos, Madagascar, Malaysia, Marshall Islands, Myanmar, Namibia, Nicaragua, Nigeria, Oman, Palau, Papua New Guinea, Philippines, Rwanda, Saint Lucia, Samoa, Saudi Arabia, Singapore, Solomon Islands, Sri Lanka, Suriname, Taiwan, Tanzania, Timor-Leste, Tonga, Tuvalu, Uganda, Vanuatu, Venezuela, Vietnam, countries requiring passport validity of at least 4 months on arrival include Micronesia, Zambia, countries requiring passport validity of at least 3 months on arrival include Georgia, Honduras, Iceland, Jordan, Kuwait, Lebanon, Moldova, Nauru, Panama, United Arab Emirates and countries requiring passport validity of at least 1 month on arrival include Eritrea, Hong Kong, Macao, New Zealand, South Africa. Other countries require either a passport valid on arrival or passport valid throughout the period of intended stay.

See also
Visa policy of Saint Kitts and Nevis
 Arab League boycott of Israel – passport restrictions

Notes

References

Saint Kitts and Nevis
Foreign relations of Saint Kitts and Nevis